Solar power in Louisiana is ranked 34th for installed solar PV capacity as of 2017 by the Solar Energy Industry Association. The state's "solar friendliness" according to Solar Power Rocks has fallen to 50th place for 2018 as the state credit program ends and full 1:1 retail net metering is being phased out. Taxpayers still benefit from federal incentive programs such as the 30 percent tax credit, which applies to business and residential solar photovoltaic and thermal energy systems of any size.

From January 1, 2008 to June 19, 2015, Louisiana offered a 50 percent tax credit up to $12,500 for the installation of solar system for purchased systems. On a combined basis with federal tax credits, and depending on a homeowner's tax situation, this amounted to an 80 percent tax credit for solar installations less than $25,000 in value, as well as a smaller credit for leased solar systems, which increased the affordability of solar PV and water heating.

Google's Project Sunroof estimates Louisiana to have over 20GW of rooftop solar potential; New Orleans is estimated to have over 90% of its roofs capable of solar energy production.  

New Orleans' largest solar array is the 1MW array installed by Blattner Energy at the Entergy Patterson facility in New Orleans East. The largest solar project in the state of Louisiana as of 2018 was the 1.2MW rooftop solar system at the Mall of Louisiana, completed in 2017 by Solar Alternatives and Strata Solar.

A planned 345 MW project in Pointe Coupée Parish will more than double the solar power capacity in the state.

Statistics 

Source: NREL

Note: Source gives conflicting information for 2011 and 2012.

See also

Solar power in the United States
Renewable energy in the United States

External links
 Gulf States Renewable Energy Industries Association
 Louisiana solar cost estimate
 Open PV Database
 New Orleans Solar Calculator
 Renewable energy policies and incentives

References

Energy in Louisiana
Louisiana